The London Regiment was an infantry regiment in the British Army, part of the Territorial Force (renamed the Territorial Army in 1921). The regiment saw distinguished service in the First World War and was disbanded in 1938, shortly before the Second World War, when most of its battalions were converted to other roles or transferred elsewhere. The lineage of some (but not all) of its former battalions is continued by the current regiment of the same name.

History

1908

The regiment was first formed in 1908 to regiment the 26 Volunteer Force battalions in the newly formed County of London, each battalion having a distinctive uniform. The London battalions formed the London District, which consisted principally of the 1st and 2nd London Divisions.

First World War
Now part of the Territorial Force, the London Regiment expanded to 88 battalions in the First World War. Of these, 49 battalions saw action in the trenches of the Western Front in France and Flanders, six saw action in the Gallipoli Campaign, 12 saw action at Salonika, 14 saw action against the Turks in Palestine, and one saw action in Waziristan and Afghanistan.

Shortly after the outbreak of the First World War, the formation of Reserve or 2nd-Line units for each existing Territorial Force unit was authorised. They were distinguished by a '2/' prefix from their parent unit (prefixed '1/'). Initially these were formed from men who had not volunteered for overseas service, and the recruits who were flooding in. Later they were mobilised for overseas service in their own right and new 3rd Line units were created to supply drafts to the two service battalions. Unusually, the 1st, 2nd, 3rd and 4th London Battalions each sent three battalions overseas and formed 4th Line reserve units. Thus the 26 pre-war battalions of the London regiment became 82 battalions.

In June 1915, men of Territorial Force units who had only volunteered for Home service were formed into composite Provisional Battalions for coast defence. In 1916 the Military Service Act swept away the Home/Overseas service distinction and the provisional battalions took on the dual role of home defence and physical conditioning to render men fit for drafting overseas. For example, the 100th Provisional Battalion was formed from Home Service men of 173rd (3/1st London) Brigade (3/1st, 3/2nd, 3/3rd and 3/4th Bns London Regiment). 104th and 105th Provisional Battalions were assigned to the Honourable Artillery Company (which was nominally a battalion of the London Regiment but never accepted that identity), whilst 100th–103rd and 106th–108th Provisional Battalions were assigned to the London Regiment in general.

Post-war
The London Regiment was reformed in the Territorial Army in the 1920s and its individual battalions were granted battle honours in 1924. However, the regiment ceased to exist in 1938 and the battalions were all transferred to regular infantry regiments, the Royal Artillery or the Royal Engineers. For example, 5th Battalion became 1st Battalion, London Rifle Brigade, The Rifle Brigade (Prince Consort's Own).

List of battalions

Notes

References

Sources
 Becke, Major A.F., (2007) History of the Great War: Order of Battle of Divisions, Part 2b: The 2nd-Line Territorial Force Divisions (57th–69th), with the Home-Service Divisions (71st–73rd) and 74th and 75th Divisions, London: HM Stationery Office, 1937/Uckfield: Naval & Military Press, .
 Becke, Major A.F., (2007) History of the Great War: Order of Battle of Divisions, Part 3a: New Army Divisions (9–26), London: HM Stationery Office, 1938/Uckfield: Naval & Military Press, .
 Grey, Major W.E., (2002) 2nd City of London Regiment (Royal Fusiliers) in the Great War 1914–19, Westminster: Regimental Headquarters, 1929/Uckfield: Naval & Military Press, 
 Grimwade, Captain F. Clive, (2002) The War History of the 4th Battalion The London Regiment (Royal Fusiliers) 1914–1919, London: Regimental Headquarters, 1922/Uckfield, Naval & Military Press, .

 
Infantry regiments of the British Army
Regiments of the British Army in World War I
Military units and formations in London
1908 establishments in the United Kingdom
1938 disestablishments in the United Kingdom
Military units and formations established in 1908
Military units and formations disestablished in 1938
Army Reserve (United Kingdom)
County of London